The Nations Cup is the oldest and one of the most important roller hockey tournaments in the world. It is played every two years in the city of Montreux, in Switzerland.
The last edition was the 68th and took place in April 2019.

Results

Summaries

Ranking

External links

Swiss websites
Official Website
Federation Suisse de Rink-Hockey

International
 Roller Hockey links worldwide
 Mundook-World Roller Hockey
Hardballhock-World Roller Hockey
 World Roller Hockey Blog
rink-hockey-news - World Roller Hockey

 
S
Roller hockey in Switzerland
Sport in Montreux
Recurring sporting events established in 1930